Shaun Davis (born 1966/67-   ) (of Long Eaton, Derbyshire) was Mr. Universe in 1996. He was also Mr. UK, Mr. Britain, Mr. Europe and Mr. Pro Universe. His career ended after kidney failure and a transplant and he has campaigned campaigns for others to sign up to the organ donor. He is father to daughter Harley.

References

Year of birth missing (living people)
Living people
People from Long Eaton
English bodybuilders